The Sekolah Menengah Kebangsaan (SMK) Taman Johor Jaya (1), abbreviated as SMKTJJ1, SMKJJ1 or JJ1 is a public secondary school in Malaysia. It is located in Taman Johor Jaya, Johor Bahru, Johor.

List of Classes

Peralihan 
 Peralihan: 2 classes (afternoon session)

Form 1 and Form 2 
6 classes Form 1 (afternoon session)<div>
6 classes Form 2 (afternoon session)

Form 3 
6 classes Form 3 (morning session)

Form 4 and Form 5 
 SC - Science stream: 1 classes (morning session)
 SK - CS and Business: 1 class (morning session)
 PA - Account and Business: 1 class (morning session)
 PSV - Art: 4 classes (morning session)

Form 6 
Kelas Fizikal

Kelas Anatomi

Kelas Fisiologi

Kelas Teknologi

Kelas Perakaunan

Kelas Ekonomi

Kelas Sains Sosial

Kelas Sains Kemanusiaan

Subject 
{| width="100%"
|- style="text-align:center
!rowspan="2" width="20%"|Subject
!colspan="2" width="18%"|Peralihan
!colspan="3" width="27%"|Form 1,2,3
!colspan="4" width="35%"|Form 4,5
|-
!width="80"|TABAH
!width="80"|USAHA
!width="80"|RK
!width="80"|PD
!width="80"|SP
!width="80"|SC
!width="80"|TM
!width="80"|PA
!width="80"|PSV
|-
| Bahasa Melayu  (BM)(Malay Language)
| style="background:#FDFC8F;text-align:center;"|
| style="background:#FDFC8F;text-align:center;"|
| style="background:#FDFC8F;text-align:center;"|
| style="background:#FDFC8F;text-align:center;"|
| style="background:#FDFC8F;text-align:center;"|
| style="background:#FDFC8F;text-align:center;"|
| style="background:#FDFC8F;text-align:center;"|
| style="background:#FDFC8F;text-align:center;"|
| style="background:#FDFC8F;text-align:center;"|
|-
| English UK
| style="background:#FDFC8F;text-align:center;"|
| style="background:#FDFC8F;text-align:center;"|
| style="background:#FDFC8F;text-align:center;"|
| style="background:#FDFC8F;text-align:center;"|
| style="background:#FDFC8F;text-align:center;"|
| style="background:#FDFC8F;text-align:center;"|
| style="background:#FDFC8F;text-align:center;"|
| style="background:#FDFC8F;text-align:center;"|
| style="background:#FDFC8F;text-align:center;"|
|-
| Chinese Language (Simplified)Only for Chinese students
| style="background:#FDFC8F;text-align:center;"|
| style="background:#FDFC8F;text-align:center;"|
| style="background:#FDFC8F;text-align:center;"|
| style="background:#FDFC8F;text-align:center;"|
| style="background:#FDFC8F;text-align:center;"|
| style="background:#FDFC8F;text-align:center;"|
| style="background:#FDFC8F;text-align:center;"|
| style="background:#FDFC8F;text-align:center;"|
| style="background:#FDFC8F;text-align:center;"|
|-
| Tamil LanguageOnly for India students
| style="background:#FDFC8F;text-align:center;"|
| style="background:#FDFC8F;text-align:center;"|
| style="background:#FDFC8F;text-align:center;"|
| style="background:#FDFC8F;text-align:center;"|
| style="background:#FDFC8F;text-align:center;"|
| style="background:#FDFC8F;text-align:center;"|
| style="background:#FDFC8F;text-align:center;"|
| style="background:#FDFC8F;text-align:center;"|
| style="background:#FDFC8F;text-align:center;"|
|-
| Mathematics (Math)
| 
| 
| style="background:#FDFC8F;text-align:center;"|
| style="background:#FDFC8F;text-align:center;"|
| style="background:#FDFC8F;text-align:center;"|
| style="background:#FDFC8F;text-align:center;"|
| style="background:#FDFC8F;text-align:center;"|
| style="background:#FDFC8F;text-align:center;"|
| style="background:#FDFC8F;text-align:center;"|
|-
| Additional Mathematics (AddMath)
| 
| 
| 
| 
| 
| style="background:#FDFC8F;text-align:center;"|
| style="background:#FDFC8F;text-align:center;"|
| 
| 
|-
| Science (SC)
| 
| 
| style="background:#FDFC8F;text-align:center;"|
| style="background:#FDFC8F;text-align:center;"|
| style="background:#FDFC8F;text-align:center;"|
| 
| style="background:#FDFC8F;text-align:center;"|
| style="background:#FDFC8F;text-align:center;"|
| style="background:#FDFC8F;text-align:center;"|
|-
| Sejarah (SEJ)(History)
| 
| 
| style="background:#FDFC8F;text-align:center;"|
| style="background:#FDFC8F;text-align:center;"|
| style="background:#FDFC8F;text-align:center;"|
| style="background:#FDFC8F;text-align:center;"|
| style="background:#FDFC8F;text-align:center;"|
| style="background:#FDFC8F;text-align:center;"|
| style="background:#FDFC8F;text-align:center;"|
|-
| Geografi (GEO)(Geography)
| 
| 
| style="background:#FDFC8F;text-align:center;"|
| style="background:#FDFC8F;text-align:center;"|
| style="background:#FDFC8F;text-align:center;"|
| 
| 
| 
| 
|-
| Kemahiran Hidup Bersepadu 2 - Ekonomi Rumah Tangga (KHB2)(Life Skills 2 - Home Economics)Only for girls
| 
| 
| 
| 
| style="background:#FDFC8F;text-align:center;"|
| 
| 
| 
| 
|-
| Kemahiran Hidup Bersepadu 3 - Pertanian (KHB3)(Life Skills 3 - Agriculture)Only for boys
| 
| 
| 
| 
| style="background:#FDFC8F;text-align:center;"|
| 
| 
| 
| 
|-
| Kemahiran Hidup Bersepadu 4 - Perdagangan & Keusahawanan (KHB4)(Life Skills 4 - Business & Entrepreneurship)
| 
| 
| style="background:#FDFC8F;text-align:center;"|
| style="background:#FDFC8F;text-align:center;"|
| 
| 
| 
| 
| 
|-
| Biology (BIO)
| 
| 
| 
| 
| 
| style="background:#FDFC8F;text-align:center;"|
| 
| 
| 
|-
| Physics (PHY)
| 
| 
| 
| 
| 
| style="background:#FDFC8F;text-align:center;"|
| 
| 
| 
|-
| Chemistry (CHE)
| 
| 
| 
| 
| 
| style="background:#FDFC8F;text-align:center;"|
| 
| 
| 
|-
| Perdagangan (PD)(Business)
| 
| 
| 
| 
| 
| 
| style="background:#FDFC8F;text-align:center;"|
| 
| 
|-
| Prinsip Perakaunan (PA)(Principles of Accounting)
| 
| 
| 
| 
| 
| 
| style="background:#FDFC8F;text-align:center;"|
| style="background:#FDFC8F;text-align:center;"|
| 
|-
| Information and Communications Technology (ICT)
| 
| 
| 
| 
| 
| 
| style="background:#FDFC8F;text-align:center;"|
| 
| 
|-
| Pendidikan Seni Visual (PSV)(Visual Arts)
| style="background:#FDFC8F;text-align:center;"|
| style="background:#FDFC8F;text-align:center;"|
| style="background:#FDFC8F;text-align:center;"|
| style="background:#FDFC8F;text-align:center;"|
| style="background:#FDFC8F;text-align:center;"|
| 
| 
| style="background:#FDFC8F;text-align:center;"|
| style="background:#FDFC8F;text-align:center;"|
|-
| Pendidikan Islam (PI)(Islamic Studies)Only for Muslim students
| 
| 
| style="background:#FDFC8F;text-align:center;"|
| style="background:#FDFC8F;text-align:center;"|
| style="background:#FDFC8F;text-align:center;"|
| style="background:#FDFC8F;text-align:center;"|
| style="background:#FDFC8F;text-align:center;"|
| style="background:#FDFC8F;text-align:center;"|
| style="background:#FDFC8F;text-align:center;"|
|-
| Pendidikan Moral (PM)(Moral Education)Only for non-Muslim students
| 
| 
| style="background:#FDFC8F;text-align:center;"|
| style="background:#FDFC8F;text-align:center;"|
| style="background:#FDFC8F;text-align:center;"|
| style="background:#FDFC8F;text-align:center;"|
| style="background:#FDFC8F;text-align:center;"|
| style="background:#FDFC8F;text-align:center;"|
| style="background:#FDFC8F;text-align:center;"|
|-
| Pendidikan Sivik dan Kewarganegaraan (PSK)(Civic and Citizenship Education)
| 
| 
| style="background:#FDFC8F;text-align:center;"|
| style="background:#FDFC8F;text-align:center;"|
| style="background:#FDFC8F;text-align:center;"|
| style="background:#FDFC8F;text-align:center;"|
| style="background:#FDFC8F;text-align:center;"|
| style="background:#FDFC8F;text-align:center;"|
| style="background:#FDFC8F;text-align:center;"|
|-
| Pendidikan Jasmani dan Kesihatan (PJK)(Physical and Health)
| style="background:#FDFC8F;text-align:center;"|
| style="background:#FDFC8F;text-align:center;"|
| style="background:#FDFC8F;text-align:center;"|
| style="background:#FDFC8F;text-align:center;"|
| style="background:#FDFC8F;text-align:center;"|
| style="background:#FDFC8F;text-align:center;"|
| style="background:#FDFC8F;text-align:center;"|
| style="background:#FDFC8F;text-align:center;"|
| style="background:#FDFC8F;text-align:center;"|
|-
| Bahasa Melayu Khas (BMK)
| style="background:#FDFC8F;text-align:center;"|
| style="background:#FDFC8F;text-align:center;"|
| 
| 
| 
| 
| 
| 
| 
|-
| Amalan Bahasa Melayu (ABM)
| style="background:#FDFC8F;text-align:center;"|
| style="background:#FDFC8F;text-align:center;"|
| 
| 
| 
| 
| 
| 
| 
|}

 Co-Curricular 
On every Wednesday (sometimes Saturday), co-curricular activities are usually held.

 List of Uniformed Bodies 
 The SMKTJJ1 Marching Band
 Malaysian Red Crescent Brigade Cadet
 St John Ambulance Brigade Cadet
 Malaysian Police Brigade Cadet
 Malaysian Fire Brigade Cadet
 Kadet Remaja Sekolah Malaysia Kadet Pengakap Malaysia Kadet Pandu Puteri Kadet Puteri Islam''

Societies and Club

List of the Rumah Sukan 
 Blue (Zircon)
 Green (Emerald)
 Red (Jasper)
 Yellow (Topaz)

References

External links 
 PIBG SMK Taman Johor Jaya 1 (Facebook)

Buildings and structures in Johor Bahru
Secondary schools in Malaysia
Schools in Johor